Norbert Troller (1896 in Bruenn, Austria-Hungarian Empire – 1984 in New York City, United States) was a Czech and American architect of Jewish descent. He was also an artist notable for his portrayal on life in the Theresienstadt concentration camp.

Biography 
Norbert Troller was born in Bruenn, Austria-Hungarian Empire (now Brno, Czech Republic) in 1900. He served as a soldier in World War I, and was taken prisoner by the Italians but released within a year. After the war, he studied architecture at the Brno Technical University, and as a postgraduate student, in the Academy of Fine Arts in Vienna. He then worked in various architectural firms in Brno, Czechoslovakia, as a draftsman and an architect till he had established his own practice. His projects at that time included single family residences, multifamily residential buildings, industrial buildings, banks, warehouses, department stores, shops and the interiors. His architectural practice ended abruptly with the German occupation of Czechoslovakia in the fall of 1938.

As a Jew, in 1942 he was imprisoned by the Nazis in the Theresienstadt ghetto-concentration camp. The self-government of the ghetto (the Council of Elders of Theresienstadt) hired him as an architect. During this time he produced a series of graphic drawings, showing the horrible conditions of the Jews in the camp, to be smuggled to the outside world. When the Gestapo found it, he was arrested  and jailed in 1944. Later that year he was sent to another concentration camp, Auschwitz. The Red Army liberated him in 1945. After the war he lived briefly in Cracow, Poland, making a living as a painter, before settling in Prague, and, finally, in his native Brno, where he was able to resume his architectural practice. His first success was to get a commission to build a major department store with offices (the VICHR building) in Brno. Other commissions followed. Yet, being aware of the imminent communist coup, he applied for an American visa in 1945, and emigrated to the US as soon as the coup happened in 1948.

For the next 10 years, Norbert Troller designed Jewish Community Centers for the US, Canada and Colombia, in the Building Bureau of the National Jewish Welfare Board in New York. He produced about 80 designs of those projects. The local architects had realized many of them. Simultaneously, he had developed and implemented planning and construction design standards for the Jewish Community Centers’ buildings. In 1958 he opened his own practice, and was involved in the design of residential houses, interiors of offices, showrooms, retail shops and restaurants in New York City and the metropolitan area.

Many times during his life, Norbert Troller successfully participated in architectural competitions: in Brno, where he held two personal exhibitions in the Art Center, and in America, where he won the First prize and four Third prizes in the Chicago Herald Tribune Better Rooms Competitions, 1949 – 1950. In 1981 he had an exhibition of his artwork at the Yeshiva University of New York: 300 Theresienstadt drawings. He also taught in the Peoples University in Brno and in a high school in New York City. He died in 1984.

In his memoirs he presented a detailed account of the Nazi atrocities in the Jewish concentration camps. Seven years after his death one of his memoirs was published in the US.

Selected Projects 
from 1922
 Single-family residences’ interiors. Brno, Czechoslovakia, 1922 – 1939, 1948 – 1949
 Interior furnishing: lamps, torchers, chandeliers, furniture, and tableware. Brno, Czechoslovakia, 1922 – 1939
 E. Witman house. Brno, Czechoslovakia
 Dr. Kollman house. Brno, Czechoslovakia, 1947 - 1949
 Dr. J. Lorek Hunting Lodge. Čeladná, Silesia, 1940
 Restaurant. Moravia, 1940 – 1941
 Department store. Brno, Czechoslovakia, 1947 – 1949
 Dr. Miskevics house. Brno, Czechoslovakia, 1947 – 1949
 Apartments’ interiors. New York City , 1950
 Single-family residences in Danbury and Bridgeport, Connecticut, 1953
 Nursery with school, Manhattan, New York, 1954
 Vacation house on the Lake Oscawana, New York, 1961
 Jewish Community Centers:
1948
 Bayonne, New Jersey
 Bogota, Colombia
 Elmira, New York
 Englewood, New Jersey
 Hamilton, Ontario, Canada
 Nashville, Tennessee
 New Haven, Connecticut
 Sioux City, Iowa
1949
 Duluth, Minnesota
 Jacksonville, Florida
 Memphis, Tennessee
 St. Catharines, Ontario, Canada
 Saginaw, Michigan
 Syracuse, New York
 Toronto, Ontario, Canada #1
 Washington, D.C.
 Youngstown, Ohio
1950
 Akron, Ohio
 Birmingham, Alabama #1
 Bronx, New York
 Charleston, South Carolina
 Evansville, Indiana
 Hazelton, Pennsylvania
 Houston, Texas
 Milwaukee, Wisconsin
 Scranton, Pennsylvania
 Seattle, Washington.
 Toledo, Ohio
1951
 Brookline/Boston, Massachusetts
 Los Angeles, California
 Manchester, New Hampshire
 Savannah, Georgia
 Springfield, Massachusetts
 York, Pennsylvania
 Youth Camps
1952
 Atlanta, Georgia
 Camden, New Jersey
 Louisville, Kentucky
 Oakland, California #1
 Philadelphia, Pennsylvania
 Plainfield, New Jersey
 Youth Camps
1953
 Bronx, New York
 Coatesville, Pennsylvania
 Indianapolis, Indiana
 Ottawa, Ontario, Canada
 Passaic, New Jersey
 Washington Heights, New York
1954
 Allentown, Pennsylvania
 Baltimore, Maryland
 Corpus Christi, Texas
 Pelham Parkway, New York
 Staten Island, New York
 Tucson, Arizona
1955
 Boston, Massachusetts
 Durham, North Carolina
 Harrisburg, Pennsylvania
 Kingsbridge Heights, Bronx, New York
 Pittsburgh, Pennsylvania
 Richmond, Virginia
 St. Louis, Missouri
 San Antonio, Texas #1
 Windsor, Ontario, Canada
1956
 Birmingham, Alabama #2
 Cleveland, Ohio
 Detroit, Michigan
 Kansas City, Missouri
 Long Beach, California #1
 New Brunswick, New Jersey
 Oakland, California #2
 San Antonio, Texas #2
 San Diego, California
 Toronto, Ontario, Canada #2
1957
 Dallas, Texas
 Newburgh, New York
 Salt Lake City, Utah
 Toronto, Ontario, Canada #3
1958
 Long Beach, California #2
 Toronto, Ontario, Canada #3

References

Publications 

 Norbert Troller. Theresienstadt: Hitler's Gift to the Jews. The University of North Carolina Press, 1991.

Literature 
 Magazine Interior Design. May, 1953, pp. 74 – 79
 Newspaper Chicago Sunday Tribune, May 1, 1949, Part 1, page 6

External links
 Leo Baeck Institute Archives, R. Joseph collection
 Guide to the Norbert Troller collection
 Theresienstadt
 Norbert Troller. Theresienstadt: Hitler's Gift to the Jews. The University of North Carolina Press, 1991. 
 Theresienstsdt, the "Model" Ghetto

1896 births
1984 deaths
Architects from Brno
People from the Margraviate of Moravia
Czech Jews
Jewish architects
Theresienstadt Ghetto survivors
Czechoslovak emigrants to the United States
Synagogue architecture
20th-century Czech architects
Academy of Fine Arts Vienna alumni
Auschwitz concentration camp survivors